Kursky District is the name of several administrative and municipal districts in Russia:
Kursky District, Kursk Oblast, an administrative and municipal district of Kursk Oblast
Kursky District, Stavropol Krai, an administrative and municipal district of Stavropol Krai

See also
Kursky (disambiguation)

References